The 1988 British Speedway Championship was the 28th edition of the British Speedway Championship. The Final took place on 2 May at Brandon in Coventry, England. The Championship was won by Simon Wigg, while Kelvin Tatum was second and Chris Morton beat Simon Cross in a run-off for third place.

Final 
2 May 1988
 Brandon Stadium, Coventry

See also 
 British Speedway Championship
 1988 Individual Speedway World Championship

References 

British Speedway Championship
Great Britain